Iain McKenzie (born 4 April 1959) is a Scottish Labour Party politician, who was formerly the Member of Parliament for Inverclyde. He was elected at the June 2011 by-election, and stood unsuccessfully for re-election in the 2015 general election.

Early life
McKenzie was born and raised in Greenock, Inverclyde's largest town, in the areas of Broomhill and Fancy Farm. A former employee of IBM, he was elected to Inverclyde Council, becoming Leader of the Council in February 2011.

Parliament
McKenzie's election followed the death of David Cairns, who had represented the constituency since 2001. McKenzie made his maiden speech to the House of Commons on 11 July 2011, mainly focusing on employment, opportunity and population growth in his constituency.

McKenzie was one of the few Labour MPs who initially voted against legalising gay marriage in the UK. However, on the third reading of the bill McKenzie voted for gay marriage as he was satisfied protection for religious groups had been ironed out. He also did not support British involvement in airstrikes in Iraq on 26 September 2014, for which he was sacked as a Parliamentary Private Secretary to the Shadow Defence Secretary, Vernon Coaker.

His Parliamentary biography lists his political interests as 'Europe' and 'employment'.

References

External links
Official website

Scottish Labour MPs
Politics of Inverclyde
Scottish Labour councillors
Living people
1959 births
Place of birth missing (living people)
UK MPs 2010–2015
Members of the Parliament of the United Kingdom for Scottish constituencies